WD repeat-containing protein 8 is a protein that in humans is encoded by the WDR8 gene.

Function 

This gene encodes a member of the WD repeat protein family. WD repeats are minimally conserved regions of approximately 40 amino acids typically bracketed by gly-his and trp-asp (GH-WD), which may facilitate formation of heterotrimeric or multiprotein complexes. Members of this family are involved in a variety of cellular processes, including cell cycle progression, signal transduction, apoptosis, and gene regulation. This family member is 89% identical to the mouse Wdr8 protein at the amino acid level. The function of this protein is not known, and the mouse studies suggest that the Wdr8 protein may play a role in the process of ossification (osteogenesis).

References

Further reading